Jette Sørensen (born 25 March 1961 in Odense) is a Danish rowing cox.

References 
 
 

1961 births
Living people
Danish female rowers
Sportspeople from Odense
Rowers at the 1984 Summer Olympics
Olympic bronze medalists for Denmark
Coxswains (rowing)
Olympic rowers of Denmark
Olympic medalists in rowing
Medalists at the 1984 Summer Olympics